Jean Smart is an American actress.

She is the recipient of numerous awards, including multiple Primetime Emmy Awards and a Tony Award nomination. She is known for her appearances in film, television and the theatre. Smart has been nominated for 12 Primetime Emmy Awards for her work in television, winning twice for her comedic performance in a guest starring role in Frasier (2000, 2001), for her supporting performance in Samantha Who? (2008), and for her leading role in Hacks (2021, 2022), for which she also won a Golden Globe Award in 2022. She was also nominated for the Tony Award for Best Actress in a Play for her performance in the Broadway revival of the George S. Kaufman play The Man Who Came to Dinner (2001). In 2000 she earned an Independent Spirit Award nomination for Guinevere and in 2007 she earned a Screen Actors Guild Award nomination along with the ensemble cast of the drama series 24. She has won the Critics' Choice Television Award twice for Fargo (2015), and Watchmen (2020).

Major associations

Primetime Emmy Awards

Tony Awards

Industry awards

AACTA International Awards

Dorian Awards

Drama Desk Award

Golden Globe Awards

Gotham Awards

Hollywood Walk of Fame

Independent Spirit Awards

Satellite Awards

Screen Actors Guild Award

Critics awards

Critics' Choice Television Awards

Hollywood Critics Association TV Awards

Television Critics Association Awards

References 

Lists of awards received by American actor